While the sitar had earlier been used in jazz and Indian film music, it was from the 1960s onwards that various pop artists in the Western world began to experiment with incorporating the sitar, a classical Indian stringed instrument, within their compositions.

Early uses  in Western pop music 
Before the sitar was first used on a Western pop recording, the instrument's drone had been imitated on electric guitar by the Kinks on their 1965 single "See My Friends". Another English band, the Yardbirds, hired a sitar player to play the main riff on their song "Heart Full of Soul", but the group subsequently re-recorded the track without a sitar part. The first pop release to feature sitar was instead "Norwegian Wood (This Bird Has Flown)", issued on the Beatles' Rubber Soul album in December 1965. With this sitar part, George Harrison became the first Western musician to play an Indian instrument on a commercial recording.

Harrison is recognised as having introduced the sitar to pop music due to the Beatles' popularity and cultural influence. He first picked up a sitar on the set of the Beatles' 1965 film Help!, and then purchased one of his own following a discussion about Indian classical music with David Crosby and Roger McGuinn of the Byrds in August 1965. Harrison went on to write and record "Love You To" for the Beatles' 1966 album Revolver as an Indian-style track featuring sitar, tambura and tabla. The following year, he wrote "Within You Without You" in the full Indian classical style and recorded it with musicians from the Asian Music Circle for inclusion on the Beatles' Sgt. Pepper's Lonely Hearts Club Band. From June 1966, he became a student of Indian sitarist Ravi Shankar and subsequently studied in India with Shankar and the latter's protégé Shambhu Das. In addition to introducing other Indian instrumentation on the Beatles' recordings over 1966–68, Harrison played sitar and tambura on "Tomorrow Never Knows" and "Across the Universe". In August 1966, Donovan, a friend of The Beatles, released his sitar-centered album Sunshine Superman, featuring Shawn Phillips on sitar.

In early 1966, Rolling Stones guitarist Brian Jones played sitar on "Paint It Black", having received tuition from another protégé of Shankar, Harihar Rao, and after consulting Harrison about the part. Jones also used sitar on some tracks on the Rolling Stones' 1967 album Their Satanic Majesties Request. He again played the instrument on "My Little One" in an October 1967 recording session with Jimi Hendrix, as well as tambura on the Stones' 1968 single "Street Fighting Man".

Widespread popularity, 1966–1968
Shankar credited Harrison with inspiring "the great sitar explosion" in the West, as many rock guitarists similarly adopted the instrument. A fad for sitars in pop songs soon developed, facilitated by the Danelectro Company's 1967 introduction of the first "electric sitar", known as the "Coral Electric Sitar". This instrument was an electric guitar with a distinctive sitar-like sound, rather than an acoustic sitar of the type traditionally made in India. As the electric sitar was much easier to play than the traditional version, it quickly became the preferred choice of many rock musicians. Guitarists such as Harrison, Jones, Big Jim Sullivan and Shawn Phillips were more dedicated in their approach as sitarists, however. Author Peter Lavezzoli also highlights Traffic's Dave Mason as a guitarist who displayed an obvious skill as a sitar player.

From 1966 onwards, hundreds of songs by pop artists featured sitar. The late 1960s saw the release of songs featuring the sitar that included Ricky Nelson's "Marshmallow Skies", Scott McKenzie's "San Francisco", The Cyrkle's "Turn-Down Day", The Cowsills' "The Rain, the Park, and Other Things", John Fred and His Playboy Band's "Judy in Disguise (With Glasses)", The Turtles "Sound Asleep", The Stone Poneys "Evergreen", First Edition "Just Dropped In (To See What Condition My Condition Was In)", The Chocolate Watch Band's "In the Past", The Box Tops' "Cry Like a Baby" (electric sitar), The Lemon Pipers' "Green Tambourine" (electric sitar), Traffic's "Paper Sun" and "Hole In My Shoe" Tomorrow's "Real Life Permanent Dream", July's "The Way" and The Kinks' "Fancy".

Elvis Presley had several recordings that feature the electric sitar. These include a 1967 cover of Tommy Tucker's R&B classic "Hi-Heel Sneakers", Mort Shuman's "You'll Think of Me" (1969), Percy Mayfield's "Stranger in My Own Home Town" (1969) and a cover of the Anne Murray country song "Snowbird" (1970). On "Hi-Heel Sneakers" and "Snowbird", the parts were played by session guitarist Harold Bradley, while Reggie Young played the instrument on "You'll Think of Me" and "Stranger in My Own Home Town".

The Mamas & The Papas included the sitar on tracks such as "People Like Us", "Snowqueen Of Texas', "Lady Genevieve", "I Wanna Be a Star" and "Grasshopper", and Sergio Mendes & Brazil '66 used it on “Chove Chuva”. Eric Burdon and the Animals played the instrument in the songs "Winds of Change", "No Self Pity", "Orange and Red Beams", "All Is One", "We Love You Lil" and "Monterey". The Strawberry Alarm Clock use the sitar in songs such as "An Angry Young Man", "Black Butter-Present" and "Sit with the Guru". Although often overlooked, some of the most extensive users of the instrument in contemporary music were Mike Heron and Robin Williamson of The Incredible String Band, combining folk, psychedelia with eastern influences in the songs "The Song Has No Ending Parts 1–9", "The Mad Hatter's Song" and "The Iron Stone". Steve Miller Band used sitar in their song "Wild Mountain Honey".

Art-rock bands such as The Moody Blues used the sitar on a few albums, particularly In Search of the Lost Chord. The Pretty Things' album S.F. Sorrow also featured the instrument on a few tracks, as did Procol Harum's song "In Held 'Twas In I", on the segment "Glimpses of Nirvana". Jethro Tull used the sitar on "Fat Man" and "Skating Away on the Thin Ice of the New Day", and the Strawbs included the instrument on many of their recordings. Family used sitar in the song "Face in the Cloud", released on the band's 1969 album Family Entertainment.

Donovan's hit song "Hurdy Gurdy Man" used a tambura, which can also be heard on songs such as "Sunny South Kensington", "Breezes of Patchouli", "Celeste", "Guinevere", "Three King Fishers", "Ferris Wheel" and "Fat Angel". Roy Wood from The Move played sitar on "Night of Fear" using the same riffs as Tchaikovsky's "1812 Overture", as well as the electric sitar on "Open up said the world at the door". The Dutch band Shocking Blue used the sitar in many of their songs, most prominently in "Love Buzz", "Acka Raga", "Water Boy", "Hot Sand" and "I'm A Woman". Richie Havens made extensive use of the sitar in the title track of his second album, Something Else Again. Blue Cheer used both sitar and tabla in their song "Babji (Twilight Raga)".

Subsequent usage
Although the sitar craze had died down by 1970, its distinctive sound had become an indelible part of pop music. Genesis used the electric sitar on "I Know What I Like (In Your Wardrobe)", from their fifth album Selling England by the Pound. Steve Howe of Yes used an electric sitar on the band's album Close to the Edge.

Paul Weller of The Jam briefly used the sitar on the 1980 track 'Pretty Green', from the album Sound Affects. Although it is buried well in the mix over a guitar solo, it can be heard clearly on the Demo Version, found on the Sound Affects 2010 Deluxe Edition.

Tom Petty and the Heartbreakers used a guitar fitted with a harpsichord-device to simulate a sitar for their 1985 hit "Don't Come Around Here No More". John Renbourn used the instrument prominently during his time with the folk band Pentangle, on songs such as "Once I Had a Sweetheart", "House Carpenter", "Cruel Sister", "Rain and Snow" and "The Snows". Metallica used a sitar during the intro of their 1991 song "Wherever I May Roam". Beck also used a sitar on his 1993 hit 'Loser'.

Although the sitar is not a regular staple in country music, it can be heard in Hank Williams Jr.’s A Country Boy Can Survive off his 1981 studio album The Pressure Is On and was played by Reggie Young, as listed in the ‘Personnel’ section on the album’s WikiPedia page.

Although his period of dedicated sitar study ended in 1968, Harrison continued to champion Indian classical music. In addition to producing recordings by Shankar, Harrison included sitar in "Be Here Now", "When We Was Fab" and other songs from his solo career, as well as in the Traveling Wilburys' 1990 track "The Devil's Been Busy".

Nishat Khan performed his Sitar Concerto No.1 at the BBC Proms in 2013 

Stu Mackenzie of Australian psychedelic rock band King Gizzard & the Lizard Wizard would play sitar on King Gizzard's 2013 album Float Along – Fill Your Lungs.

The sitar is featured prominently in the music of the Japanese neo-psychedelic band Kikagaku Moyo, played by Ryu Kurosawa.

Examples of sitar in songs of other genres 
Colour My World - Petula Clark
Can't Lose You – Type O Negative  
Captain of Your Ship – Reparata and the Delrons (electric sitar)
Carpet Man – The 5th Dimension
Chrome Sitar – T. Rex
Do It Again – Denny Dias / Steely Dan (electric sitar)
Every Time You Go Away – Paul Young
Greed – Tomi Koivusaari - Amorphis
Holiday Inn – Elton John
Hooked On a Feeling – B.J. Thomas
Living on the Ceiling - Blancmange (band)
Mausam and Escape – Asad Khan (Slumdog Millionaire: Music from the Motion Picture)
 Legendary lovers- Katy Perry
Metal Heart – Accept
Om – Moody Blues
Pretty Tied Up – Izzy Stradlin / Guns N' Roses 
Rolling Home - John Martyn
Signed, Sealed, Delivered, I'm Yours – Stevie Wonder
The Devil's Been Busy - Traveling Wilburys
Transdermal Celebration and Tried and True – Ween (electric sitar)
When We Was Fab – George Harrison
Band of Gold – Freda Payne
Didn't I (Blow Your Mind This Time) – The Delfonics
Cry Like a Baby – The Box Tops
Love Will Lead You Back – Taylor Dayne
 Glass Hammer regularly uses electric sitar in their songs since the addition of guitarist and sitarist Kamran Alan Shikoh to their line-up in 2009
Blackbird - Bosco and Peck - 2012
Down – St. Vincent

See also 
 Indo jazz
 Psychedelic music
 Psychedelic rock
 Raga rock
 Sitar in jazz
 Sitarla

Notes

Sources

 
 
 
 

Popular music
Psychedelic music
Sitars